Rani Rupamati's Mosque, also known as Rani Rupavati's Mosque or Mirzapur Queen's Mosque, is a medieval mosque and tomb complex in Mirzapur area of Ahmedabad, India.

History and architecture
The mosque was built by Mahmud Begada probably in the latter years (1430-1440) of Ahmad Shah I's reign. It is named after Rani Rupamati whom Mahmud Begada married after death of Qutubuddin.

This mosque measures, 105 feet long, forty-six broad, and thirty-two high. A high central arch, three imposing domes, slim minarets, carved galleries and an exquisite mihrab are there. Its three domes are linked together by a flat roof. The side entrances in the mosque open out in balcony windows on either side and end in a lattice window. The domes are supported with rows of twelve pillars each where as the smaller domes at the front and the rear of the bigger domes as well as the four corners of the mosque are there. The central section is an elevated level that rises above the small flanks and provides for a pierced clerestory, which carries the dome above. Though broken short in the 1819 Rann of Kutch earthquake, the bases of their minarets, from the fine tracery in their niches, are still the mosque's chief beauty. This is one of the buildings where the attempt to combine the arched Islamic and the flat Hindu styles was hardly a success; the plainness of the central arch clashes with the extreme richness of the upper cornice and the side minarets. Close by the mosque is a monument, with a large central and two side domes, raised over the tombs of Rani Rupamati and the other queen. The inside of the dome is richly fretted.

Gallery

References 

Mosques in Ahmedabad
Religious buildings and structures completed in 1440
Monuments of National Importance in Gujarat